Krupski - Polish noble (szlachta) family from Eastern Europe and a common surname in modern Poland.

Origin
According to Latin and Polish texts, the original name was "de Krupe". A modern form of the surname appears in 15th-century Polish texts, and in 1534 a Latin text contains the name "Crupsky". In 1550, a Valery Crupski completed his studies at Cracow University.). In 19th-century Belarusian and Russian texts, the name appears as Крупскій (Крупскі) or Крупский. Surnames in the Russian Empire became standardized after the abolition of serfdom in 1861.

Polish Roman Catholic bishop Jan Długosz (1415–1480), in his description of the Korczak coat of arms, identified Krupski with Korczak and the family's ethnic group as the Rusyns. The first known Krupski was diplomat and military commander Jerzy Krupski (1472–1548), who owned estates in Red Ruthenia (present-day Chełm and Krasnystaw Counties of Lublin Voivodeship) and built a fort in 1492.

Branches
Branches of the Krupski family are Korczak, Lewart, Kopacz, Szeliga, and Lew II.

Estates and churches
The family owned the Novoselki Igumen estate in the Minsk Governorate of the Russian Empire
and the Kaverlyany estate in the Minsk province of the Grand Duchy of Lithuania until 1742. Ezhi and Christina Krupski founded the Mother of God of Consolation (Order of Friars Minor Capuchin) church in Orchówek, near Włodawa, in 1507. In 1727, Stanislav Krupski financed the construction of the Dominican monastery in Grodno.

Grand Duchy of Lithuania and Rzeczpospolita

A Krupski coat of arms was included in the roll of arms of the Rzeczpospolita after the 1413 Polish–Lithuanian union. A Zaporozhian Cossacks register dated October 16, 1649 by John II Casimir Vasa and Bohdan Khmelnytsky contains the following:
 Vasil Krupski
 Olexa Krupski
 Leonti Krupski
 Yuri Afanasyevich Krupski
 Timis  Krupski
 Jan Krupski
 Michael Krupski

Russian Empire

Krupski was recognized in the Russian nobility of the Mogilev Governorate on March 16, 1799 and November 12, 1811 as "a noble, ancient family" in a six-volume genealogy book. Some family members were not part of the Russian nobility, and paid taxes. Other branches of the family were included in the nobility of the Minsk, Vitebsk, Vilna, Kovno, Volhynia, Podolia and Kiev Governorates. The family were members of the Eastern Catholic Churches and the Roman Catholic and Russian Orthodox Churches. In the Russian Empire, some became Orthodox priests.

USSR
Nadezhda Krupskaya, wife of Vladimir Lenin, was a member of the family. During World War II, 772 family members died in military service;  Polish officer Roman Krupski was killed in the Katyn massacre. Ninety family members were repressed by the Communist regime and rehabilitated posthumously.

Variants
The masculine form in Belarusian is Крупскі; the Polish form is Krupski, the Russian form is Крупский and the Ukrainian form Крупський. The feminine suffix is -aya (Krupskaya). In English-speaking countries, the gender difference is not observed.

Diaspora and toponyms
More than 2,000 descendants live primarily in Belarus, Lithuania, Ukraine, Poland and Russia, and a smaller number live in Latvia, Estonia, Great Britain, Ireland, Germany, Sweden, Switzerland, France, Italy, the US (which recorded the first Krupski immigrants from Europe in 1880), Canada, Australia, Moldova, Tajikistan, Uzbekistan, Kazakhstan, Georgia, Israel and South Africa. Krupski is a district in the Minsk Region of Belarus, and Krupski Młyn is a commune and village in Tarnogur County, Silesian Voivodeship, Poland.

Notable family members
 Andrey Kurbsky, from the Lewart branch of the family in the Grand Duchy of Lithuania
 Nadezhda Krupskaya, Soviet official and wife of Vladimir Lenin
 Janusz Krupski, Polish historian and official
 Dania Krupska, American dancer and choreographer

See also
Pratulin Martyrs

Notes

References

 "Ogrod krolewski", Paprocki Bartlomiej, D. Siedlczanski, Praga, 1599 r.
 str.93, Tom 8, "Rodzina Herbarz szlachty polskiej", S. Uruski, Poznan, 1997.
 str.222, t.1, "Urzednicy Wielkiego ksiуstwa Litewskiego (Spisy)", Warszawa-2001; t.1 "Wojewodstwo Wilenskie. XIV-XVIII wiek", pod red. A. Rachuby; t.4, Warszawa-2003; "Ziemia Smolenska i wojewodstwo Smolenskie XIV-XVI wiek").
 выпуск 1-31, "Историко-юридические материалы, извлеченные из актовых книг губерний Витебской и Могилевской, хранящихся в Центральном архиве в Витебске и изданные", Созонов, Дм. Ив.Довгялло, губернская типо-литография, г. Витебск, 1871–1903.
 том I-XXXIX, "Акты издаваемые Виленскою Археографическою Комиссиею для разбора Древних Актов", г. Вильна, 1865–1915.
 :ru:Дворянская родословная книга
 :pl:Herbarz (heraldyka)
 Herbarz Wołyński - opracowanie: Towarzystwo "Pro Archivo", Kraków (Krupski 1866–1909, Krupski 1839–64, Krupski 1802-48)
 str. 123–156, S. Dumin, S. Górzyński. Spis szlachty wylegitymowanej w guberniach grodzieńskiej, mińskiej, mohylewskiej, smoleńskiej i witebskiej. - Warzsawa: DiG, 1993 r. (стр. 123–156, С. Думин, С. Гуржинский. Список дворянства, утвержденного в Витебской, Гродненской, Минской, Могилевской и Смоленской губерниях. - Варшава: DiG, 1993 г.)
 стр. 25, "Смоленская шляхта", под редакцией Б. Г. Федорова, том II, издательство "Русское экономическое общество", 2006 г.
 str. 58–59, "Herbarz szlachty prowincyi Witebskiej", wydanie Herolda Polskiego, w Krakowie, 1899 r.
 str. 93, tom IX, "Herbarz Polski", Kaspra Niesieckiego S.J., w Lipsku, 1842 r.
 str. 223–227, str. 396, tom 5, "Herbarz Polski", Kaspra Niesieckiego S.J., w Lipsku, 1840 r.
 str. 349–351, tom XII, cz. 1, "Herbarz Polski", Adam Boniecki, Warszawa, 1908 r.
 str. 189, "Spis nazwisk shlachty Polskiey", Jerzy Sewer Hr. Dunin-Borkowski, Lwow, 1887 r.
 str. 240, "Zbior nazwisk szlachty", P.N. Małachowski, Lublin, 1803 r.
 str. 177–182, tom 1, "Herby szlachty Polskiej", Zbigniew Leshchyc, w Poznaniu, MCMVIII r.
 str. 53, cz. 1, "Wiadomość o kleynocie szlacheckim oraz herbach domów szlacheckich w Koronie Polskiey i Wielkim Xięstwie Litewskim", E.A. Hr. Kuropatnicki, Warszawa, 1789 r.
 str. 194–230, t.1, "Monografie historyczno-genealogiczne niektórych rodzin polskich", S.K. Kossakowski, Warszawa, 1859 r.
 str. 376–387, t.1, "Herbarz wielu domow Korony Polskiey y W. X. Litewskiego", Stanislaw Jozef (A Duneburg) Duńczewski, "Zamoicii in Collegio Universitatis", z drukarni B. Jana Kantego (Kraków), (Menfis) 1756 r.
 Brzezina Winiarski A. Herby Szlachty Rzeczypospolitej. - Warszawa, 2006.
 Znamierowski A. Herbarz rodowy. - Warszawa, 2004.
 "Перапiс войска Вялiкага княства Лiтоускага 1528 года", г. Мінск, 2003 г.

Lithuanian noble families
Polish noble families
History of Lithuania (1219–1569)
Ruthenian noble families